The Territorial Army was the national ground force of the Ethiopian Empire. It operated essentially as a loosely organized auxiliary force serving to aid in local police work. It was dominated by a group of officers known as "The Exiles" for their role in fleeing Ethiopia with Haile Selassie in 1936 after the Second Italo-Ethiopian War.

History 
It was formed as part of Haile Selassie's transformation strategy, with the mission being to disarm the guerrillas that took part in the Ethiopian Civil War. Emperor Selassie authorized the recruitment of many shifta in the Territorial Army during its existence. Over time, it was gradually incorporated into the regular army. In late June 1974, officers of the Territorial Army formed the Derg.

Role 
The Territorial Army's provincial units, commanded by the governor general, assisted the national police force in areas where police were scarce. It also guarded magazines, communication lines and other important places.

See also 

 Ethiopian National Defense Force
 Law enforcement in Ethiopia

References 

Military units and formations of Ethiopia
Reserve forces